Time in Sierra Leone is given by Greenwich Mean Time (GMT; UTC±00:00). Sierra Leone has never observed daylight saving time. Sierra Leone adopted its current time zone in 1939, switching from UTC−01:00.

IANA time zone database 
In the IANA time zone database, Sierra Leone is given one zone in the file zone.tab – Africa/Freetown. "SL" refers to the country's ISO 3166-1 alpha-2 country code. Data for Sierra Leone directly from zone.tab of the IANA time zone database; columns marked with * are the columns from zone.tab itself:

References

External links 
Current time in Sierra Leone at Time.is
Time in Sierra Leone at TimeAndDate.com

Time in Sierra Leone